The San Manuel Arizona Railroad  is an Arizona short-line railroad that operates from a connection with the Copper Basin Railway (CBRY) at Hayden, Arizona to San Manuel, Arizona, .

History
San Manuel Arizona Railroad was constructed by a joint venture consisting of Utah Construction Company and The Sterns-Roger Manufacturing Company, which had a contract with San Manuel Copper Corporation for the construction of the railroad. The company was incorporated September 29, 1953, and the railroad began operations in 1955.  The copper mine at San Manuel was permanently closed in October 2003. The SMA ceased operations in 1999. In July 2012, work was started to re-open the operation [construction of a new locomotive inspection and servicing shop & Administrative Offices] and upgrade of 29+ miles of mainline track between San Manuel & Hayden (Arizona). In April 2013, it was announced the railroad will be purchased by Capstone Mining Corp. as part of the Pinto Valley mine operation acquisition from BHP Billiton in 2013. Capstone idled the railroad in 2016.

Donated equipment 
In 2017, SMARRCO donated rider car #184 to the Arizona Railway Museum in Chandler, Arizona. This car along with two other rider cars were built by Magor Car Corporation in 1955 for SMARRCO. During operation, the conductor would ride in the car to operate the horn at grade crossings when the car was in the lead on the empty shove to the mine.

References

1953 establishments in Arizona
1999 disestablishments in Arizona
Defunct Arizona railroads
Railway companies disestablished in 1999
Railway companies established in 1953
Transportation in Pinal County, Arizona
American companies established in 1953